Amal Abdo Saad-Ghorayeb is a Lebanese writer and political analyst known for her writings on the Israeli–Lebanese conflict and Hezbollah.

Life
Saad-Ghorayeb was an assistant professor of political science at the Lebanese American University until 2008. She received her Ph.D. from the University of Birmingham, England. She was a visiting scholar at the Carnegie Middle East Center (CMEC).

In 2009, she declined the invitation to speak at the NATO Defense College, because this would have involved talking to Israeli military officers, which is against Lebanese law.

Her articles have appeared in openDemocracy, Foreign Affairs, The Washington Post, and Lebanon's Al Akhbar.

While discussing the 2006 Lebanon War, Noam Chomsky cited her as "the leading Lebanese academic scholar of Hezbollah".

Her father, Abdo Saad, is a prominent Shiite pollster; her mother is Christian.

She resides in Lebanon.

Publications
 Hezbollah: Politics and Religion. London: Pluto Press. 2001, 
 The Iran Connection: Understanding the Alliance with Syria, Hizbullah and Hamas, I. B. Tauris & Company, Limited, 2011

References

External links
Her Twitter account,
ASG's counter-hegemony unit, a blog maintained by Amal Saad-Ghorayeb.
"Will Hizballah intervene in the Gaza conflict?", Electronic Intifada, 11 January 2009
"Hezbollah", Alternative Radio, 19 June 2007
"Hezbollah's Role in Lebanon's Government", NPR, July 13, 2006

Academic staff of Lebanese American University
Living people
Lebanese Shia Muslims
Lebanese writers
Arab–Israeli conflict
Year of birth missing (living people)
Alumni of the University of Birmingham